643 Scheherezade is a minor planet orbiting the Sun. It was named after the fictional storyteller Sheherazad.

References

External links 
 Lightcurve plot of 643 Scheherezade, Palmer Divide Observatory, B. D. Warner (2005)
 Asteroid Lightcurve Database (LCDB), query form (info )
 Dictionary of Minor Planet Names, Google books
 Asteroids and comets rotation curves, CdR – Observatoire de Genève, Raoul Behrend
 Discovery Circumstances: Numbered Minor Planets (1)-(5000) – Minor Planet Center
 
 

Cybele asteroids
Scheherezade
Scheherezade
P-type asteroids (Tholen)
19070908